Ibitiruna is a genus of longhorn beetles of the subfamily Lamiinae, containing the following species:

 Ibitiruna araponga Galileo & Martins, 1997
 Ibitiruna fenestrata (Bates, 1881)

References

Hemilophini